Dillon Pennington (born 26 February 1999) is an English cricketer. He made his List A debut for Worcestershire in the 2018 Royal London One-Day Cup on 7 June 2018. Prior to his List A debut, he was named in England's squad for the 2018 Under-19 Cricket World Cup.

He made his first-class debut for Worcestershire in the 2018 County Championship on 25 June 2018. He made his Twenty20 debut for Worcestershire in the 2018 t20 Blast on 8 July 2018. In May 2021, in the 2021 County Championship match against Derbyshire, Pennington took his maiden five-wicket haul in first-class cricket. Ahead of the inaugural season of The Hundred, he was signed by the Birmingham Phoenix.

References

External links
 

1999 births
Living people
English cricketers
Worcestershire cricketers
Place of birth missing (living people)
Shropshire cricketers
Sportspeople from Shrewsbury
English cricketers of the 21st century
Birmingham Phoenix cricketers